This list is of the Historic Sites of Japan located within the Prefecture of Akita.

National Historic Sites
As of 1 July 2019, thirteen Sites have been designated as being of national significance (including one *Special Historic Site); Mount Chōkai spans the prefectural borders with Yamagata.

|}

Prefectural Historic Sites
As of 24 May 2019, forty Sites have been designated as being of prefectural importance.

Municipal Historic Sites
As of 1 May 2018, a further one hundred and seventy-eight Sites have been designated as being of municipal importance.

See also
 Cultural Properties of Japan
 Dewa Province
 Mutsu Province
 Akita Prefectural Museum
 List of Cultural Properties of Japan - paintings (Akita)
 List of Places of Scenic Beauty of Japan (Akita)

References

External links
  Cultural Properties in Akita Prefecture

Akita Prefecture
 Akita